HMS H33 was a British H class submarine built by Cammell Laird, Birkenhead. She was laid down on 20 November 1917 and commissioned on 17 May 1919.

In March 1937 the submarine navigated the Gloucester and Sharpness Canal in the company of  whose commander had arranged the trip. During Warship Week March 1942 H33 was adopted by East Dean RDC (Gloucestershire).  HMS H33 was scrapped at Troon on 19 May 1944.

Design

H33 was fitted with an anti-aircraft gun and four  torpedo tubes. Its torpedo tubes were fitted to the bows and the submarine was loaded with eight  torpedoes. It is a Holland 602 type submarine but was designed to meet Royal Navy specifications. Its complement was twenty-two crew members.

See also
 List of submarines of the Second World War

References

Bibliography
 

 

British H-class submarines
Ships built on the River Mersey
1918 ships
World War I submarines of the United Kingdom
World War II submarines of the United Kingdom
Royal Navy ship names